Martin Field  is a privately owned, public use airport located three nautical miles (6 km) southwest of the central business district of South Sioux City, in Dakota County, Nebraska, United States.

Facilities and aircraft 
Martin Field covers an area of 175 acres (71 ha) at an elevation of 1,100 feet (335 m) above mean sea level. It has one runway designated 14/32 with an asphalt surface measuring 3,323 by 50 feet (1,013 x 15 m).

For the 12-month period ending June 8, 2011, the airport had 10,550 aircraft operations, an average of 28 per day: 99% general aviation and 1% military. At that time there were 36 aircraft based at this airport: 97% single-engine and 3% glider.

References

External links 
 Martin Field (7K8) at Nebraska Department of Aeronautics
 Aerial image as of March 2000 from USGS The National Map
 

Airports in Nebraska
Buildings and structures in Dakota County, Nebraska